In Greek mythology, the name Anchialus (Ancient Greek: Ἀγχίαλος means 'near the sea') may refer to the following characters:
Anchialus, a 'well-skilled' Greek warrior who participated in the Trojan War. He and Menesthes, while riding a chariot, were killed by the Trojan hero Hector.
Anchialus of Taphos, father of Mentes.
Anchialus, a Phaeacian who participated in the games in honor of Odysseus.

Notes

References 

 Homer, The Iliad with an English Translation by A.T. Murray, Ph.D. in two volumes. Cambridge, MA., Harvard University Press; London, William Heinemann, Ltd. 1924. . Online version at the Perseus Digital Library.
Homer, Homeri Opera in five volumes. Oxford, Oxford University Press. 1920. . Greek text available at the Perseus Digital Library.
 Homer, The Odyssey with an English Translation by A.T. Murray, PH.D. in two volumes. Cambridge, MA., Harvard University Press; London, William Heinemann, Ltd. 1919. . Online version at the Perseus Digital Library. Greek text available from the same website.

Achaeans (Homer)
Characters in the Odyssey